Yang Keng is a Chinese billionaire whose fortune derives from his stake in Sichuan Languang Development. He began in auto parts before transitioning into real estate. He resides in Chengdu, and attended Sichuan University.

References

Chinese billionaires
Year of birth missing (living people)
Living people
Place of birth missing (living people)
Sichuan University alumni
Businesspeople from Chengdu